Oughtonhead may refer to:

Oughtonhead Common, a Local Nature Reserve in Hitchin
Oughtonhead Lane, Site of Special Scientific Interest in Hitchin
Oughtonhead Nature Reserve, a Herts and Middlesex Wildlife Trust nature reserve in Hitchin

See also
Oughton
River Oughton